Christian Harald Lauritz Peter Emil Bohr (1855–1911) was a Danish physician, father of the physicist and Nobel laureate Niels Bohr, as well as the mathematician and football player Harald Bohr and grandfather of another physicist and Nobel laureate  Aage Bohr. He married Ellen Adler in 1881.

Personal life
He wrote his first scientific paper, "Om salicylsyrens indflydelse på kødfordøjelsen" ("On salicylic acid's influence on the digestion of meat"), at the age of 22. He received his medical degree in 1880, studied under Carl Ludwig at University of Leipzig, took a Ph.D. in physiology and was appointed professor of physiology at the University of Copenhagen in 1886.

On his religious views, Bohr was raised as a Lutheran. He was an atheist in later life.

Christian Bohr is buried in the Assistens Kirkegård.

Physiology
In 1891, he was the first to characterize dead space.

In 1904, Christian Bohr described the phenomenon, now called the Bohr effect, whereby hydrogen ions and carbon dioxide heterotopically decrease hemoglobin's oxygen-binding affinity. This regulation increases the efficiency of oxygen release by hemoglobin in tissues, like active muscle tissue, where rapid metabolization has produced relatively high concentrations of hydrogen ions and carbon dioxide.

References

Sources
Fredericia, L.S. (1932) Christian Bohr, pp. 173–176 in: Meisen, V. Prominent Danish Scientists through the Ages. University Library of Copenhagen 450th Anniversary. Levin & Munksgaard, Copenhagen.

1855 births
1911 deaths
Danish atheists
Danish scientists
Danish physiologists
Academic staff of the University of Copenhagen
Science teachers
Scientists from Copenhagen
Niels Bohr
Rectors of the University of Copenhagen
Christian
Former Lutherans